The 2015–16 Fordham Rams men's basketball team represented Fordham University during the 2015–16 NCAA Division I men's basketball season. The Rams, led by first year head coach Jeff Neubauer, played their home games at Rose Hill Gymnasium as a member of the Atlantic 10 Conference. They finished the season 17–14, 8–10 in A-10 play to finish in eighth place. They lost in the second round of the A-10 tournament to Richmond. They were invited to the CollegeInsdier.com Tournament where they lost in the first round to Boston University.

Previous season
The Rams finished the 2014–15 season 10–21, 4–14 in A-10 play to finish in twelfth place. They advanced to the second round of the A-10 tournament where they lost to VCU.

Departures

Incoming recruits

Roster

Schedule and results

|-
!colspan=9 style=| Non-conference regular season

|-
!colspan=9 style=| Atlantic 10 regular season 

|-
!colspan=9 style=| Atlantic 10 tournament

|-
!colspan=9 style=| CIT

See also
2015–16 Fordham Rams women's basketball team

References

Fordham
Fordham Rams men's basketball seasons
Fordham
Fordham
Fordham